Cirratulus is a genus of annelids belonging to the family Cirratulidae.

The genus has cosmopolitan distribution.

Species:

Cirratulus abranchiatus 
Cirratulus abyssorum 
Cirratulus africanus 
Cirratulus alfonsinae 
Cirratulus annamensis 
Cirratulus assimilis 
Cirratulus australis 
Cirratulus balaenophilus 
Cirratulus blainvillei 
Cirratulus borealis 
Cirratulus branchioculatus 
Cirratulus caudatus 
Cirratulus cingulatus 
Cirratulus cirratus 
Cirratulus concinnus 
Cirratulus dillonensis 
Cirratulus elongatus 
Cirratulus exuberans 
Cirratulus flavescens 
Cirratulus fuscescens 
Cirratulus gilchristi 
Cirratulus glandularis 
Cirratulus hedgpethi 
Cirratulus incertus 
Cirratulus indicus 
Cirratulus jucundus 
Cirratulus knipovichana 
Cirratulus longicephalus 
Cirratulus longisetis 
Cirratulus medusa 
Cirratulus megalus 
Cirratulus mianzanii 
Cirratulus miniatus 
Cirratulus multioculatus 
Cirratulus norvegicus
Cirratulus obscurus 
Cirratulus orensanzii 
Cirratulus pallidus 
Cirratulus parafiliformis 
Cirratulus parvus 
Cirratulus patagonicus 
Cirratulus revillagigedoensis 
Cirratulus robustus 
Cirratulus serratus 
Cirratulus sinincolens 
Cirratulus spectabilis 
Cirratulus tumbesiensis 
Cirratulus wladislavi 
Cirratulus zebuensis 
Cirrhatulus auricapillus

References

Annelids